The Flight Test Range (FTR) at Sonmiani Beach is a primary rocket launch site in Balochistan, approximated  west of Karachi, Sindh, Pakistan.

The facility is operated by the Space Research Commission since 1962, initially focusing on supporting civilian space program involving the launch of sounding rockets but its mission has been moved towards national security programs in 1990.

History

Initially established at Sonmiani Rocket Range in 1961, the Sonmiani Flight Test Range is the only rocket launch facility operated by the Space & Upper Atmosphere Research Commission. It was the crucial contribution from the American National Aeronautics and Space Administration (NASA) that established the facility in 1961 with Suparco launching the Rehbar-I program that consisted of a Nike-Cajun combination on June 7, 1962.

In 1989, the Sonmiani FTR mission was moved from supporting the civilian space program towards supporting the national security program when Hatf-I (lit. Target) was launched from the facility. Since 1990, the Sonmiani FTR has been expanded and modernized that now includes the several rocket launch sites,  a rocket assembly and a maintenance workshop; a payload assembly area; high-speed tracking radars with a control room and telemetry station; flight communications equipment and optical cameras.

The Sonmani FTR, not a space center, now serves as a primary launch site for Pakistani military's missile testing program, namely launching the Hatf program (Target), including four tests of Hatf-II, two of Hatf-III, seven of Hatf-IV and five of Hatf-VI– a missile testing program managed by the Pakistan Air Force's Strategic Command.

See also 
 Space and Upper Atmosphere Research Commission
 Tilla Satellite Launch Center
 Sonmiani

References

External links 
 
 Astronautix.com page on Sonmiani

Science and technology in Pakistan
Space programme of Pakistan
Rocket launch sites
SUPARCO facilities
1962 establishments in Pakistan
Military installations in Balochistan, Pakistan